Debra Ann McGee (born 31 October 1958) is an English television, radio and stage performer who is best known as the assistant and widow of magician Paul Daniels. McGee is a former ballet dancer and for three years was artistic director of her own ballet company. She presents a Sunday morning show for BBC Radio Berkshire. McGee was a finalist in BBC's 2017 Strictly Come Dancing,  a winner of the 2019 Christmas Special, and as of January 2018 is a recurring member of the Loose Women panel.

Early life and magic career 
McGee was born in 1958 in Kingston upon Thames, to Patrick McGee and Lillian Howes. She has two younger siblings, a sister called Donna and a brother named Robert. When McGee was young her parents ran a corner shop. Later, her father worked for a large manufacturing firm making gold rings and other jewellery.

McGee attended Our Lady Immaculate RC Primary School in Tolworth, followed by Tolworth Girls' School, a secondary school also in Tolworth. At the age of 16 McGee auditioned for and won a place at the Royal Ballet School. After graduating, she joined the Iranian National Ballet Company in Tehran. Aged 19, she became part of the Corps de Ballet and later a soloist, but her ballet career was brought to an abrupt halt by the Iranian Revolution. She was forced to flee the country and returned to the UK with little in the way of money and possessions. Seeking new work she auditioned for the Bernard Delfont Organisation, which was responsible for a number of big summer resort shows and touring productions.

Delfont found her a job performing on stage with magician Paul Daniels in his 1979 summer show at the Britannia Pier Theatre in Great Yarmouth. She met Daniels on 23 May 1979 at rehearsals for the show, which were held at a church hall in London.

She later joined Dougie Squires's Second Generation troupe as a dancer, which involved touring Europe with acts including Chris de Burgh and James Last. After winter work in pantomime, McGee joined Daniels again for his 1980 summer season in Bournemouth. She then performed in his London stage show It's Magic, which opened on 10 December 1980 and which, by the time it closed 14 months later, had become the longest running magic show ever to play in the West End.

McGee achieved national and international fame through television appearances with Daniels. After seeing her on stage in the West End, BBC producer John Fisher asked Debbie to appear in the BBC1 series The Paul Daniels Magic Show, which had begun in 1979. That series continued until 1994 and regularly attracted audiences of 15 million in the UK and was sold to 43 countries. Daniels regularly referred to McGee on his TV shows as "The lovely Debbie McGee", a phrase that entered popular culture as a stereotype for magicians' assistants. Daniels and McGee were married in Buckinghamshire in April 1988.

In October 1991, McGee was one of the first female magicians to become members of The Magic Circle, a society for British professional magicians. She celebrated by appearing on TV to perform a trick accompanied by Daniels as her assistant "The Lovely Paul", who was not allowed to speak during the performance.

McGee was the 2017 winner of the Magic Circle's Maskelyne award "for services to British Magic", the same award that her husband received in 1988.

McGee's pastimes include golf and she has played in celebrity charity events.

In January 2019, McGee announced that she had overcome the early stages of breast cancer in 2018, however after a small surgical procedure was given the all-clear.

Other work

Dance company 
In 2000, McGee and Daniels set up Ballet Imaginaire to produce ballet shows and tour them around the country. However, the enterprise did not have financial success.

Radio 
In 2004 McGee presented Box Jumpers, a two-part radio documentary about magician's assistants for BBC Radio 4. She works as a presenter for BBC Radio Berkshire, where, since 8 June 2008, she has hosted a regular Sunday morning show from 9 am to noon.

On 12 June 2018, McGee was a guest on the BBC Radio 4 programme My Teenage Diaries.

Television and film 

In 2001, McGee and Daniels were the subjects of an episode of When Louis Met..., a documentary filmed by Louis Theroux. The episode, titled When Louis Met... Paul and Debbie, was broadcast on BBC Two and subsequently Netflix.

In 2001, McGee appeared in the documentary Paul Daniels in a Black Hole, which challenged Daniels to be recognised as a famed magician in the United States within one week.

McGee appeared on comedian Caroline Aherne's talk show  The Mrs Merton Show in 1995; Aherne's character Mrs Merton asked McGee "what first attracted you to the millionaire Paul Daniels?", a joke which a poll later ranked as Britain's second-best one-liner.   The couple later joked about the quip, with Daniels saying "when Debbie and I got married, I certainly wasn't a millionaire and the other funny thing was Caroline had just married a millionaire so we thought that was hysterical". Calling the continuing popularity of the joke "lovely", McGee credits the appearance on Mrs Merton for kickstarting her own fame, saying "after Mrs Merton people started to really recognise me. It gave us great publicity."

In October 2004, McGee and her husband appeared on The Farm, Five's version of the RTÉ show Celebrity Farm. In May 2006, she appeared on The X Factor: Battle of the Stars with her husband singing "Let Me Entertain You" by Robbie Williams. Debbie and Paul were knocked out in the first round of the talent show.

On 1 April 2007, McGee appeared along with her husband, Vanessa Feltz, and her fiancé Ben Ofoedu in a celebrity edition of Channel 4's hit reality television show Wife Swap. In 2008 McGee appeared on Ant & Dec's Saturday Night Takeaway. On 14 September 2010, McGee appeared on the celebrity version of Come Dine with Me.

In 2012, McGee made a cameo appearance as herself in an episode of the UK TV comedy drama Stella.

In 2017, McGee appeared alongside Nigel Havers, Simon Callow and Lorraine Chase in Barging Loving Celebs.

She took part in Celebrity MasterChef in 2017. In August 2017, it was announced that McGee would be appearing as a contestant on the fifteenth series of Strictly Come Dancing where her professional dance partner was Giovanni Pernice. The couple reached the final but were beaten by Joe McFadden and Katya Jones.

In November 2017 she appeared alongside Chesney Hawkes in Celebrity Antiques Road Trip.

In December 2019, McGee appeared in the quiz show Tenable All Stars for a Christmas special.

Other activities 
McGee worked alongside her husband in venues around the world. Also, according to the biography on her personal website, she was writing a book. A cookery and party book written by McGee has appeared on WH Smith and Amazon websites called Dine with Debbie, although it is no longer in print. In 2005 she became the brand ambassador for "Good Boy" chocolates.

In 2006 McGee and friend Sue Simons created modelling and casting agency Debbie McGee Models.

In February 2009, McGee and Daniels appeared in Closer magazine in a picture recreating an image from an Armani advert that featured footballer David Beckham and his wife Victoria.
Later in the summer of that year, she appeared in a fringe theatre show in London called Frank's Closet.

On 21 August 2013, McGee took part in the Dead Air Podcast, a show hosted by Nick Lee and Rob Oldfield.

From 9 December 2016 to 1 January 2017, McGee starred in the pantomime Aladdin as Slave of the Ring at the Grand Opera House, York.

She is known for her work with dogs.

References

External links 
 
 The Debbie McGee Show (BBC Radio Berkshire)
 

1958 births
Living people
People educated at the Royal Ballet School
People educated at Tolworth Girls' School
People from Wargrave
English magicians
English radio presenters
English television presenters
People from Kingston upon Thames
The X Factor (British TV series) contestants